The Campus Blairon is a business incubator, education site, local government site, medical post and a seminar centre located in Turnhout in the campine region of the Antwerp province (Belgium). Both the Artesis Hogeschool Antwerpen and the Katholieke Hogeschool Kempen are located on the Campus.

History
For about 50 years the Campus Blairon was known as the training centre nr. 3 Majoor Blairon of the Belgian army. New recruits started their training at the Blairon barracks. In 1994 the last recruits started their training and in 1999 the military site was closed. A new destination for the building was sought for and the new project started in 2000.

 2000: The gate building was sold to the Flemish Innovation Center for Graphic Communication.
 2001: The Northern area was sold the Katholieke Hogeschool Kempen (KHK, E: Catholic College of the Campine).
 2002: Opening of the Europeion building
 2003: First users enter the Pieter Corbeels building.
 2004: Cinema was sold to the Van Eyck Group and the Stadskantoor (E: City office) is opened.
 2005: The Arrestatiegebouw links (E: Prisonbuilding left) was sold to the Antwerp province and the new parking space was opened.
 2006: The medical post starts in the Pieter Corbeels building.
 2008: The last available open space of the Pieter Corbeels building is being used and the project Lokerenstraat KLE starts. The former Paradeplein (E: Parade square) becomes a parking site.

Sources
 Campus Blairon (Gazet van Turnhout, Dutch)
 Campus Blairon (Dutch)
 Katholieke Hogeschool Kempen naar Campus Blairon (Dutch)

See also
 Innotek
 Strategic Plan Campine

Turnhout
Business incubators of Belgium
Buildings and structures in Antwerp Province